Benipatti is a town and headquarter of sub-division Benipatti (अनुमंडल), in Madhubani district, in the Mithila region of Bihar, India. The native language of Benipatti is Maithili, while the official languages are Hindi and Urdu.

Culture
Benipatti has a versatile culture. Majority of people living here, speak Maithili. People traditionally wear dhoti, gamcha and saree. Madhubani painting is very famous here. Local cuisine includes thekua, litti, and other sweets. Durga Puja, Chhath Puja and Holi are popular festivals celebrated here.

Geography 
Benipatti is situated near to the Himalayas and the Indo-Nepal frontier. Benipatti is close to the Bagmati river, and has many small rivers, canals and ponds, which make a diversified aquatic ecosystem. It is a flood prone region, receiving an annual rainfall of about 1270mm. The territory has vast cultivated fields, and moderately dense vegetation. Palm trees grow in large numbers in the region.

Administration 
The current administrative officers of Benipatti are:
Sub-divisional magistrate — Mukesh Ranjan Jha
Deputy superintendent of police — Pushkar Kumar
BDO — Dr. Abhay Kumar
Co — Pallavi Kumari

Economy
Benipatti is a hub of the bordering regions of Bihar. The main occupations are farming and business.

Transportation
Benipatti is connected by road to the state capital Patna, and also to bordering towns of Nepal. Rail network is not directly available from the town, with the nearest railway station in Madhubani, 25 km away. The nearest airport is Darbhanga Airport approx 35 km away.

Education
Government/Tagged Institutions

Bachcha jha janta high school Arer,
Sri Liladhar High School, Benipatti
+2 Project Girls High School, Benipatti
Dr N. C. College, Benipatti
K.V. Science College, Ucchaith Benipatti
S. C. Mahila College, Benipatti
P D C P College, Basaith Benipatti

Private Institutions
Madona English School
Knowledge Development Kindergarten Academy
Momentum Classes, Benipatti by Himanshu sir
Nand niketan Arer. Vidya bharti public school January,
Star Mission School
D P S Benipatti
Mithilanchal Pride English School
Central Public School
S. S. Gyan Bharti Public School
Mithila Academy Mahamadpur

External links 
BNN News Benipatti

Cities and towns in Madhubani district